The following is a list of National Collegiate Athletic Association (NCAA) Division I college soccer individual statistics and records through the NCAA Division I Men's Soccer Championship as of 2012.

Tournament Scoring and Assist Leaders

Individual Records
Most Goals, Single Game: 7
Thompson Usiyan, Appalachian State (1978; vs. George Washington)
Most Goals, Tournament: 7
Thompson Usiyan, Appalachian State (1978; vs. George Washington–7 and Clemson–0)
Most Goals, Career: 13
AJ Wood, Virginia (1991–1994)
Most Assists, Game: 3
Hugh Copeland, Brown (1976, vs. Bridgeport)
Dale Russell, Philadelphia U. (1976, vs. Penn State)
Duncan MacDonald, Hartwick College (1976, St. Francis, NY)
Robert Byrkett, Appalachian State (1977, vs. George Washington)
Tim Guelker, SIU Edwardsville (1978, vs. Clemson)
Peter Dicce, Temple (1979, vs. Penn State)
David Borum, Houston Cougars (1979, vs. Houston Cougars Intramural Team)
Dario Brose, NC State (1985, vs. South Carolina)
Toby Taitano, San Diego (1990, vs. Portland)
Billy Baumhof, South Carolina (1990, vs. Air Force)
Andre Parris, Princeton (1993, vs. Penn State)
Daniel Falcone, Portland (1995, vs. Butler)
Yuri Lavrinenko, Indiana (1995, vs. Evansville)
Matt Crawford, North Carolina (2002, vs. Winthrop)
Simon Schoendorf, South Florida (2005, vs. Stetson)
Cody Arnoux, Wake Forest (2008, vs. South Florida)
Colin Rolfe, Louisville (2011, vs. Maryland)
Most Assists, Tournament: 6
Andre Parris, Princeton (1993; vs. Columbia–1, Penn State–3, and Hartwick–2)
Most Assists, Career: 11
Yuri Lavrinenko, Indiana (1996–1999)
Most Points, Game: 15
Thompson Usiyan, Appalachian State–7 goals, 1 assist (1978; vs. George Washington)
Most Points, Tournament: 15
Thompson Usiyan, Appalachian State–7 goals, 1 assist (1978; vs. George Washington–7 goals, 1 assist and vs. Clemson–0 goals, 0 assists)
Most Points, Career: 29
Dave MacWilliams, Philadelphia U.–11 goals, 7 assists (1976–1978)
AJ Wood, Virginia–13 goals, 3 assists (1991–1994)
Aleksey Korol, Indiana–12 goals, 5 assists (1996–1999)
Most Saves, Game: 28
Frank Crupi, Farleigh Dickinson (1975; vs. Bucknell)
Lowest Goals-against Average, Tournament (Minimum 3 games): 0.00
Peter Arnautoff, San Francisco (1976; vs. San Jose State, Clemson, and Indiana)
Jon Belskis, Wisconsin (1995; vs. William & Mary, SMU, Portland, and Duke)
Aaron Sockwell, SMU (1997; vs. Rider, Dartmouth, and Saint Louis)
David Meves, Akron (2009; vs. South Florida, Stanford, Tulsa, North Carolina, and Virginia)
Lowest Goals-against Average, Career (Minimum 5 games): 0.38
Don Copple, Saint Louis–3 goals, 8 games, 720 minutes (1969–1970)

All-Tournament Teams

References

External links 
 NCAA Men's Soccer

records